Worswick is a locational surname of Old English origin. It refers to the village of Urswick, Lancashire, England. 

Notable people with the surname include:

G.D.N. Worswick (David Worswick) (1916–2001), British economist
Micky Worswick (born 1945), English footballer
Ross Worswick, British TV personality
Jason Worswick, Notorious bounder and cad.

References